Basar may refer to:

 Gnana Saraswati Temple, Basar, Hindu temple located on the banks of the Godavari River
 Basar, Telangana, India
 Basar, Arunachal Pradesh, India

See also 
 Basara (disambiguation)
 Basra (disambiguation)
 Bazaar (disambiguation)
 Başar, Turkish name